Good Feeling is the debut studio album by Scottish alternative rock band Travis. The 
album was released on 8 September 1997, on Independiente Records. All four singles released from the album reached the UK Top 40 (with Tied To The 90s making to Top 30).

Background and release

Once set up in London, the band spent between nine months and a year recording new songs. The band played their first London show at the famous Dublin Castle in Camden. With around twenty good songs ready, they then approached managers Colin Lester and Ian McAndrew of Wildlife Entertainment, who then introduced the band to Andy MacDonald, owner of Go! Discs Records and founder of Independiente Records. The band was signed to MacDonald personally, not to the label—if MacDonald ever leaves the Sony-financed label Independiente Records, the band goes with him (commonly referred to in the industry as a "golden handcuffs" clause).

The album itself has a much more upbeat and 'rockier' sound than their subsequent releases and is often regarded as one of their best. In 2000 the album was re-released, with the only differences being new album artwork (featuring a headshot of the band on a black background) and a slightly-tweaked version of "More Than Us". In April 2021, Craft Recordings re-issued the album on vinyl with the original cover (featuring a full band shot with a mostly white background).

Production

Produced by Steve Lillywhite of U2 fame, Travis' first studio album, 1997's Good Feeling, is a rockier, more upbeat record than the band's others to date. Recorded at the legendary Bearsville Studios in Woodstock, New York, the place where Travis favourite The Band recorded, the album contained singles such as "All I Want to Do Is Rock", "U16 Girls", the Beatle'esque "Tied to the 90's", "Happy" and "More Than Us". Guest musicians include Page McConnell of Phish playing keyboards on the title track "Good Feeling". The album reached No. 9 on the British charts, but with little radio play, it slipped from the charts relatively quickly, dropping to number 26 and then 53 over the next couple of weeks (though over the next few years it would end up with 27 weeks inside the Top 100, making it the third longest chart run for a Travis album). Although it heralded Travis' arrival on the British music scene, received extremely positive reviews, and substantially broadened Travis' fan base, it sold just 40,000 copies. Following the release, Travis toured extensively, their live performances further enhancing their reputation. This included support slots in the UK for Oasis, after Noel Gallagher became an outspoken fan.

Track listing
All tracks written by Fran Healy.

Personnel
Fran Healy – vocals, guitar
Andy Dunlop – guitar
Dougie Payne – bass guitar
Neil Primrose – drums
Page McConnell – keyboards

References

Travis (band) albums
1997 debut albums
Albums produced by Steve Lillywhite
Independiente Records albums